Pseudoclavibacter is a Gram-positive non-spore-forming, strictly aerobic and non-motile genus from the family Microbacteriaceae. Pseudoclavibacter bacteria can cause endocarditis in rare cases.

References 

Microbacteriaceae
Bacteria genera
Taxa described in 2004